Wyndham House may refer to:

 Wyndham House, London
 Wyndham House, Oxford